= Cover Up (board game) =

1988 board game

Cover Up is a board game published in 1988 by Manik Games.

== Contents ==
Cover Up is a game in which two deductive games are based on a detective theme.

== Reception ==
John Humphries reviewed Cover Up for Games International magazine, and gave it a rating of 7 out of 10, and stated that "I would recommend this game, especially at the price."
